The Open Water film series consists of American-distributed standalone survival-horror and natural horror-shark thriller movies, inspired by the real-life disappearance of Tom and Eileen Lonergan. The overall plot centers around individuals who are stranded in the ocean and must fight to survive the hours alone.

The first film was a massive financial and critical success, with film critics praising its minimalistic filmmaking. The sequels were met with mixed-at-best and poor respective critical reception, while both fared well overall financially.

Films

Open Water (2004)

Daniel and Susan take a tropical vacation, which includes scuba-diving adventures. Excited for their diving certifications, the pair dive deeper than the rest of their group and get separated. Following an incorrect head-count and believing the entire class is accounted for, the boat returns to land. When the couple resurfaces, they see a vessel in the distance and decide to wait for its return. As time passes, and stranded miles from shore with Caribbean reef sharks stalking them below, the likelihood of their survival grows smaller by the moment.

Open Water 2: Adrift (2007)

Amy and James, with their baby Sarah, travel to Mexico to celebrate their friend Zach's thirtieth birthday. Upon arriving, they're reunited with common friends, Zach, Lauren, and Dan. Together they set sail on Dan's new yacht, where they're introduced to his new girlfriend named Michelle. The group party, drinking alcohol while they reminisce. When they stop for a swim, Amy stays in the boat with her baby and no intention to join the rest, due to a childhood traumatic event in the ocean. Dan keeps her company for a time, before he picks her up and throws her into the water below. Irresponsibly, he falls overboard as well. Once everyone is in the water, it's realized that no one lowered the ladder while they were on deck. Following hours of struggling and failing to climb the freeboard, Michelle claims that she saw sharks in the water and unsettling exhaustion overtakes the group. Stranded in the open waters of the Pacific Ocean, panic and desperation leads to a tragic fight for survival; while Amy must use her motherly instincts to return to her daughter, to overcome her fears. As time passes, their chances of survival lessen.

Open Water 3: Cage Dive (2017)

Determined to experience adrenaline-filled thrills of coming face-to-face with great white sharks, three friends from California travel to Australia for a cage-diving encounter. Josh, together with his half-brother Jeff and Jeff's girlfriend Megan, set out to film an audition tape for an extreme stunts reality-TV show. Tensions arise when Jeff discovers that Josh and Megan are having an affair. Things take a despairing turn while they are in the safety of the shark-proof cage, when a rogue wave capsizes their boat leaving the trio stranded in the open water of the sea. As the day turns to night, hysteric fear overtakes them as a swarm of hungry sharks hunt them from below. As the predators close in on them, the friends do all they can to survive until morning.

Main cast and characters

Additional crew and production details

Reception

Box office and financial performance

Critical and public response

References 

Horror film series